Jennifer Gibney (born 7 July 1964) is an Irish actress. She is best known for playing Cathy Brown in the BBC television sitcom, Mrs. Brown's Boys.

Gibney appears in Mrs. Brown's Boys as the daughter of Agnes Brown, played by her real-life husband, Brendan O'Carroll.

Career
Gibney started work as a civil servant in the Irish tax office for seven years, and then joined the Bank of Ireland. She studied for a drama degree while at the bank and joined the company's amateur dramatics group. She trained to be an actress at Dublin Oscar Theatre School, gaining her first professional acting role in 1996, with a minor part in Some Mother's Son, a film starring Helen Mirren.

Strictly Come Dancing

In 2014, Gibney took part in the twelfth series of Strictly Come Dancing. She was partnered with Irish professional, Tristan MacManus. She was voted off in week three of the series after dancing to ABBA's Mamma Mia on Movie Week. She competed in the bottom two against Blue star Simon Webbe and his partner Kristina Rihanoff.

Note: Donny Osmond was a guest judge for the third week

Personal life
Gibney has been married to Brendan O'Carroll since 2005 and has three stepchildren: Fiona, Danny—who also appear in Mrs. Brown's Boys—and Eric.

Filmography
Television

Film

References

1964 births
Living people
20th-century Irish actresses
20th-century Irish civil servants
21st-century Irish actresses
Actresses from Dublin (city)
Bank of Ireland people
Irish film actresses
Irish television actresses